Left Coast Lifter is a floating derrick barge or sheerleg which was built to assist in the eastern span replacement of the San Francisco–Oakland Bay Bridge. The barge carries a shear legs crane which is the largest barge crane ever used on the  U.S. West Coast.  The barge's name is taken from "Left Coast", a slang term for the West Coast of the United States (which appears on the left side of a typical map and also refers to the region's liberal, or "left leaning", political tradition).

Operational history

Left Coast Lifter was built for the American Bridge/Fluor joint venture (ABFJV), which was the lead contractor on the self-anchored suspension eastern span replacement. The barge was built in Portland, Oregon by U.S. Barge, LLC and ferried to Shanghai, where it was fitted with a shear-leg crane manufactured by Shanghai Zhenhua Port Machinery Co. Ltd (ZPMC). The completed sheerleg was ferried back to the United States on a semi-submersible heavy-lift ship, Zhen Hua 22 (IMO 8106446).

Before Left Coast Lifter was fitted out with the crane for bridge construction, it was deemed to violate the Jones Act, specifically in that since the integral crane would be built and installed in China, it could not be used to transport goods by water between U.S. ports. Therefore its first job, prior to installation of the crane, was to haul dredged materials to Long Beach.

Bay Bridge
After Left Coast Lifter arrived at the Bay Area in March 2009, it was used to place pre-fabricated falsework truss sections and the 28 box girder deck sections. Before the heavy deck sections for the Bay Bridge were lifted, Left Coast Lifter raised a sunken tugboat in August 2009, USS Wenonah. The first deck section was lifted in February 2010, and the last deck section was lifted in October 2011.

Tappan Zee Bridge

American Bridge/Fluor solicited offers for Left Coast Lifter in 2012, after the conclusion of its work on the Bay Bridge. A consortium of companies, Tappan Zee Constructors (TZC, a joint venture of Fluor, American Bridge, Granite and Traylor Brothers), purchased the crane barge, which gave them a competitive edge in the bidding process for the construction of the Tappan Zee Bridge replacement across the Hudson River. Reportedly, according to the purchase agreement between TZC and ABFJV, Left Coast Lifter will be returned to ABFJV once the work on the Tappan Zee Bridge is completed.

Now nicknamed I Lift NY, the barge is still officially registered with the U.S. Coast Guard as Left Coast Lifter. The crane departed San Francisco Bay under tow in December 2013, transited the Panama Canal in January 2014, and arrived at Jersey City at the end of January. There it was refitted with an upgraded control system before arriving at the job site in October 2014. Left Coast Lifter made its first lift on the new Tappan Zee bridge in April 2015, a steel-reinforced concrete pile cap which formed part of the bridge's foundation.

The massive crane was being used for heavy lifts of large bridge sections, and placed the final steel girder for the new Rockland-bound (westbound) span in October 2016. The final lift for the eastbound span to Westchester was completed in April 2018. Between and after the assembly of the new bridge spans, Lifter was also used for heavy lifts during the dismantling of the original Tappan Zee Bridge at that location.

The eastern span of the old Tappan Zee Bridge was dropped into the Hudson via controlled detonation in January 2019; although the intent was to dismantle the bridge in place, during opening celebrations for the replacement Mario M. Cuomo Bridge in September 2018, a loud pop was heard and the original Tappan Zee bridge was closed to workers, as engineers determined it had become unstable. The Federal Highway Administration approved a revised plan to detonate the original bridge's supports in December 2018. "I Lift NY" was used to retrieve portions of the old bridge from the Hudson; in October 2019, the crane left the Hudson and was stored on Staten Island, at Caddell Dry Dock and Repair Co., Inc.

Spuyten Duyvil Bridge
Left Coast Lifter was also used for a heavy lift during the summer 2018 maintenance of the Spuyten Duyvil Bridge; the crane moved the swing section of the bridge onto a barge in June to facilitate work on electrical and mechanical equipment that had been damaged during Hurricane Sandy. The bridge was returned in August, once refurbishment was complete.

Design
The barge was designed by Glowacki Engineering (GE). It is generally a single rake 400' x 100' deck cargo barge. However it features various significant internal structural enhancements to bear the loads imposed at the deck level by the crane at the boom foot, the mast, and the back stays. GE received those loads from ZPMC and modified their design to suit. Liftech Consultants assisted ABFJV with design review for the crane, including developing the technical specifications sent to ZPMC. The project received three Excellence in Structural Engineering awards:

 2010 Award of Excellence for Special-Use Structures, from the Structural Engineers Association of Northern California
 2010 Award of Merit for Special-Use Structures, from the Structural Engineers Association of California
 2011 Outstanding Project, from the National Council of Structural Engineers Associations

While transporting the sheerleg, the heel pin support may be moved towards the bow of the barge in order to lower the boom and the overall profile of the barge, facilitating transport.

It is the largest barge crane ever used on the U.S. West Coast.

See also

 Big Blue
 Breakwater Crane Railway
 Finnieston Crane
 Fairbairn steam crane
 Kockums Crane
 Mastekranen
 Samson & Goliath
 Taisun
 Titan Clydebank

References

External links

 
 
 
 

2009 ships
Crane vessels
Individual cranes (machines)